Caty McNally and Alycia Parks defeated Alicja Rosolska and Erin Routliffe in the final, 6–3, 6–2 to win the doubles tennis title at the 2022 Ostrava Open.

Sania Mirza and Zhang Shuai were the reigning champions, but did not participate.

Seeds

Draw

Draw

References

External links
Main draw

Ostrava Open - Doubles
2022 Doubles